This article includes the statistics of the First League of Bosnia and Herzegovina in the 1998–99 season.  It was contested only by Bosniak and Croatian clubs.  Serbian clubs played in the 1998–99 First League of the Republika Srpska.

Overview
It was contested by 16 teams (Bosniak Group) and 14 teams (Croat Group).

Originally playoff between Croat and Bosniak Group was scheduled, but due to stadium reason, the playoff was canceled. The title was awarded to FK Sarajevo, but neither clubs were qualified for European competition.(Only Jedinstvo Bihac)

Bosniak First League

League standings

Results

First League of Herzeg-Bosnia

League standings

See also
1998–99 First League of the Republika Srpska

References
Bosnia-Herzegovina - List of final tables (RSSSF)

First League of Bosnia and Herzegovina seasons
1998–99 in Bosnia and Herzegovina football
Bosnia